Joseph Hunter Bryan (April 9, 1782 – December 28, 1839) was a Congressional Representative from North Carolina. He was born in Martin County, North Carolina, and was a brother of Henry Hunter Bryan.

Member of the State house of commons 1804, 1805, and 1807–1809; trustee of the University of North Carolina at Chapel Hill, 1809–1817, and was sent to Tennessee on behalf of the university to secure from the general assembly of Tennessee its claims to escheated lands; elected as a Democratic-Republican to the Fourteenth and Fifteenth Congresses (March 4, 1815 – March 3, 1819); interment in Elmwood Cemetery, Memphis, Tennessee. He died at La Grange, Tennessee.

See also 
 Fourteenth United States Congress
 Fifteenth United States Congress

External links 
 U.S. Congress Biographical Directory entry

1782 births
1839 deaths
Members of the North Carolina House of Representatives
Democratic-Republican Party members of the United States House of Representatives from North Carolina
19th-century American politicians
People from Martin County, North Carolina